Diploë ( or )  is the spongy cancellous bone separating the inner and outer layers of the cortical bone of the skull. It is a subclass of trabecular bone.

In the cranial bones, the layers of compact cortical tissue are familiarly known as the tables of the skull; the outer one is thick and tough; the inner is thin, dense, and brittle, and hence is termed the vitreous table. The intervening cancellous tissue is called the diploë. In certain regions of the skull this becomes absorbed so as to leave spaces filled with liquid between the two tables.

Etymology 
From Ancient Greek διπλόη (diplóē, “literally, a fold”), noun use of feminine of διπλόος (diplóos, “double”)

References

External links

Skull

de:Spongiosa